Javier Sánchez de Felipe (born 14 March 1997) is a Spanish professional footballer who plays for Real Valladolid as a central defender.

Club career

Real Madrid
Born in the Madrid outskirts of Getafe, Sánchez finished his development at Real Madrid after joining the club's academy at the age of 8. He made his senior debut with the reserve team in the Segunda División B, his first match occurring on 10 October 2015 in a 1–0 home win against Arenas Club de Getxo when he was still a junior.

Sánchez scored his first goal for Castilla and in the third division on 3 December 2016, in a 1–1 home draw to CDA Navalcarnero. In the summer of 2018, he was selected by first-team manager Julen Lopetegui for the United States pre-season tour.

Sánchez's maiden competitive appearance with Real Madrid took place on 31 October 2018 which also marked new coach Santiago Solari's debut, and the former featured the entire 4–0 victory at UD Melilla for that season's Copa del Rey. He first appeared in the UEFA Champions League one week later, coming on as a 59th-minute substitute for Sergio Ramos in the 5–0 group stage away rout of FC Viktoria Plzeň. His first La Liga game was on the 11th, when he replaced fellow youth graduate Sergio Reguilón at the end of the first half of an eventual 4–2 defeat of RC Celta de Vigo at Balaídos. He scored his first goal still in that year, contributing to the 6–1 home win against Melilla in the Spanish Cup return leg.

Valladolid
On 27 July 2019, Sánchez was loaned out to fellow top-tier side Real Valladolid in a season-long deal. The move was made permanent on 16 June 2020, with the player signing a contract until 2024.

After winning promotion from the Segunda División as runners-up, Sánchez scored his first goal in the top flight on 5 November 2022, opening the 2–1 home defeat of Elche CF.

Style of play
A quick, versatile, tall and strong defender who chooses the right moment to attack, Sánchez is an ambidextrous player with excellent positioning. A leader on the pitch, he is also technically gifted.

Career statistics

References

External links

1997 births
Living people
Spanish footballers
Footballers from Madrid
Association football defenders
La Liga players
Segunda División players
Segunda División B players
Real Madrid Castilla footballers
Real Madrid CF players
Real Valladolid players
Spain youth international footballers